Uber  is an American multinational ride-hailing company.

Über is a German language word meaning "over", "super", "above" or "across". 

Uber or Über may also refer to:

Arts, entertainment and media
 Über (album), a 2006 album by the Norwegian black metal band Sturmgeist
 UBER, a proposed 2009 album by T-Pain
 Über (comics), a 2010s Anglo-American comic book series
 Uberfic or uber, a genre of alternate universe fan fiction

People
 Alexander Uber (1783–1824), German cello virtuoso, composer, and Kapellmeister
 Betty Uber (1906–1983), English badminton player, for whom the Uber Cup was named
 Christian Benjamin Uber (1746–1812), German jurist and composer
 Friedrich Christian Hermann Uber (1781–1822), German composer
 Uber Baccilieri (1923–2007), an Italian boxer

Other uses
 Uber Cup, a major international Women's badminton competition
 Uber Entertainment, an American video game development company

See also
 
 
 Über alles (disambiguation)
 Unter (disambiguation), German antonym of Über
 Betula uber, the Virginia round-leaf birch tree